Dil Ki Baat may refer to:

 Dil Ki Baat (Hariharan album), 1989
 Dil Ki Baat (Junaid Jamshed album), 2001